BINA: The Jewish Movement for Social Change is a Jewish non-profit organization and educational institution that offers pluralistic programs and forums for adults and young adults seeking to explore their Jewish roots. It was founded in 1996, and has centers in  Tel Aviv, Jerusalem, Haifa and Beer Sheva, Israel. BINA means "wisdom" in Hebrew and is an acronym for "A Home for the Creation of Our Nation's Souls", a phrase coined by Hebrew poet Chaim Nachman Bialik.

History
BINA was founded as the "Center for Jewish Identity and Hebrew Culture'" by a group of scholars and educators from the Kibbutz Movement and operates under the Israeli nonprofit Merhavim Hevra Lehinuch Vetarbut. The organization's stated mission is to engage secular Israelis and Jews from all over the world in Jewish study, social justice and action, community, leadership, and to strengthen the democratic and pluralistic aspects of Israel through the notion of "repairing the world", tikkun olam.

The assassination of Prime Minister Yitzhak Rabin in 1995 exposed deep rifts in Israeli society causing many secular Israelis to question the shared Jewish narrative and value system in Israel. Wanting to find a way for secular Israelis to reconnect with Israel and Jewish values, a group of intellectuals and educators created BINA as a forum for exploration of Jewish identity for the secular community. The aim was to restore the connection between modern Israeli culture and Jewish heritage and offer a way for secular Israelis to express their Jewish identity through social action and community building.

BINA is supported by the Posen Foundation and other donors in Israel and the USA.

The organization established the first Secular Yeshiva in Israel and currently operates branches in Tel-Aviv, Jerusalem, Haifa and Beer Sheva.

Programs
The programs offered by BINA are targeted towards the secular Israeli community and diaspora Jews seeking a meaningful experience in Israel.

The Secular Yeshiva: The BINA Secular Yeshiva was established in 2006 in south Tel Aviv, one of the most underserved communities in Israel. As the only yeshiva of its kind in Israel, the Secular Yeshiva serves as a place where young adults study and interpret Jewish texts and culture as a way to promote Jewish pluralism and social justice. The Secular Yeshiva is a Jewish cultural and educational center where activities and holiday services are open to the public.  In 2015, there were over 200 students enrolled in the Secular Yeshiva's seven main programs. In 2011 BINA's Jerusalem Secular Yeshiva was opened.

Mechina: A year-long army preparatory course for Israelis age 17–19.  During this year students take courses on traditional and modern Jewish texts with an emphasis on social justice, Jewish Philosophy and Identity as a means to prepare for the army.  Participants also volunteer two days a week in the community at various educational-welfare organizations in Tel Aviv.

Garin Nahal and Shnat Sherut: Garin Nahal and Shnat Sherut is BINA's army volunteer program for 18- to 24-year-olds.  Participants study and volunteer in underprivileged communities prior to and as part of their army and national service duty.

Post Army program in Jerusalem: The Secular Yeshiva in Jerusalem offers a 4-month immersion study program for post-army Israeli participants (age 22–30).

Masa Israel Teaching Fellowship (MITF) Tel Aviv+ Track: MITF is a Masa Israel Journey 10-month fellowship for English-speaking college graduates ages 21–35. Participants spend 5 months living in Tel Aviv and 5 months in another city of their choice: Beit Shean, Nazareth, Rahat, or Kiryat Gat and act as English teaching assistants in Israeli elementary schools throughout the year. 

BINA Gap Year in Israel:
BINA's Gap Year in Israel is a Gap-Year program centered around social action and studying for international Jewish high school graduates ages 17–19.  Participants live, study and volunteer in Tel Aviv with BINA's Mechina program. Studies include an in-depth look into classical Jewish texts (Tanakh and Talmud) from a pluralistic perspective, Jewish thought and philosophy, social justice and economic theory, Zionism and Israel studies.

BINA Bashchuna: BINA Bashchuna (Wisdom in the Neighborhood) was founded in the early 2000s as a community social action program. This program was designed to serve the underprivileged communities of South Tel Aviv, Yafo, Beer Sheva (Shchuna Daled), Beit Shemesh and Ramle and has since expanded through a partnership with the JDC's "Better Together" program. This program is a comprehensive community building initiative (CCI), addressing the educational, welfare and cultural needs of impoverished communities; ranging from after-care centers for children-at-risk to working with the elderly community. The goal of BINA Bashchuna is to revitalize and empower local communities by creating groups of local activists including adults and young adults who live, work, volunteer and study all within the neighborhoods – thus significantly boosting the local communities. BINA Bashchuna also aims to create a Jewish pluralistic culture in communities throughout Israel.

International Tours and Seminars:
BINA offers seminars and tours out of the Secular Yeshiva in south Tel Aviv, for visitors from Israel and all over the world addressing a wide range of topics including Jewish pluralism in Israel, social justice and social issues through a Jewish lens.

Beit Midrash: BINA's Beit Midrash (House of Learning) offers a series of semester and year long courses for adults in Jewish and Hebrew literature, history, and philosophy.

Mithabrot: Mithabrot (Women Connect) is an educational empowerment program for young girls and women in disadvantaged communities.  The program uses the Jewish tradition of the Bat Mitzvah as a tool to educate women on topics such as body image, sexuality, family, religion, rights and responsibilities, careers, and ambitions. It also offers girls a meaningful Bat Mitzvah ceremony, which many girls in Israel do not have an opportunity to experience.

Jewish Education in Public Schools: BINA provides informal Jewish education in public schools throughout Israel, with a focus on themes of Jewish pluralism, Judaism as a culture and Jewish social justice.

BINA IDF (Israeli Defense Force) Programs: BINA offers weekend seminars and single-day workshops for numerous IDF units of soldiers and officers.  These workshops are focused on Jewish Identity in the context of the military.

Faculty
The faculty of BINA consists of historians, writers and educators, including: Haim Be'er, Dov Elbaum, Ari Elon, Rabbi Benny Lau, Ronny Someck, Tsvia Walden.

Achievements
BINA was awarded the Constantine Prize in Jewish Education from Tel-Aviv University for its success in using Jewish values to promote community service and social justice in youth.

In 2009–10 BINA was awarded the Gerald Corner Paths for Peace Fund for its work toward Jewish Pluralism and social activism in Beer Sheva, Israel.

In 2013 BINA acquired a public tender for teaching a course to Israel Defense Forces (IDF) officers designed to strengthen their Jewish and Israeli values and character.

References

External links
 BINA: The Jewish Movement for Social Change Official Website
 BINA Gap Year in Israel

Jewish organizations based in Israel
1996 establishments in Israel
Jewish organizations established in 1996
Jewish outreach